A Fistful of Stances is a 2010 TVB television drama from Hong Kong produced and created by Lee Tim-shing.  The Chinese title, literally meaning "Iron Horse Seeks Bridge," defines a person who is able to finally use his high potential to learn powerful techniques.

Synopsis
Au-Yeung Wai-Lan (Yuen Qiu), owner of a martial arts training school, is reunited with her long-lost son Ku Yu Cheung (Kevin Cheng) after years of agonizing separation. On his return home, Yu-Cheung is shocked to find that his younger brother Koo Yu-Tong (Kenneth Ma) has been critically ill and that his father was murdered long ago by Wing Tak (Dominic Lam), the existing director of a pharmaceutical company and a bitter old foe of the Koos.

Pinning all the family hope on Yu-Cheung, he later learns a special set of kung fu skills, and register for the Seven States Martial Arts Championship Tournament. Out of the blue, Yu-Cheung's opponent in the final turns out to be Wing Man-Kwan (Jacky Heung).

After the tournament, Yu-Cheung and his family found evidence to prove to everyone that Wing Tak is guilty. Wing Tak began to use cruel ways again to save himself.

Cast
Ku family

Chow family

Wing family

Other cast

Awards and nominations
TVB Anniversary Awards (2010)
 Nominated: Best Drama
 Nominated: Best Actor (Kevin Cheng)
 Nominated: Best Supporting Actor (Dominic Lam) Top 5
 Nominated: Best Supporting Actress (Angela Tong)
 Nominated: Best Supporting Actress (Kara Hui) 
 Nominated: Best Supporting Actress (Selena Lee)
 Nominated: My Favourite Male Character (Kenneth Ma) Top 5
 Nominated: Most Improved Actor (Alex Lam)
 Nominated: Most Improved Actress (Selena Li)
 Won: Most Improved Actress (Natalie Tong)

Viewership ratings

References

External links
TVB.com A Fistful of Stances - Official Website 
K for TVB A Fistful of Stances - Series Synopsis

TVB dramas
2010 Hong Kong television series debuts
2010 Hong Kong television series endings